Ngayon at Kailanman may refer to:
 "Ngayon at Kailanman" (song), a song originally sung by Basil Valdez
 Ngayon at Kailanman (2009 TV series), a Philippine telenovela aired on GMA Network
 Ngayon at Kailanman (2018 TV series), a Philippine telenovela aired on ABS-CBN

tl:Ngayon at Kailanman